Fuller Mellish (January 3, 1865 – December 7, 1936), born Harold Arthur Fuller, was an English born American stage and screen actor. He was the father of Fuller Mellish Jr.(of Applause fame) and Vera Fuller Mellish. His parents were Charles Perry Fuller and Rose (née Leclercq). Mellish began his stage career in 1881 and performed in his last play in 1935.

Filmography

The Dancing Girl (1915)
The Eternal City (1915)
Four Feathers (1915)
Gambier's Advocate (1915)
A Royal Family (1915)
Esmerelda (1915)
The Tortured Heart (1916)
Mayblossom (1917)
The Power of Decision (1917)
The Trail of the Shadow (1917)
The Unforseen (1917)
The Inner Voice (1920)
The Silent Barrier (1920)
Diane of Star Hollow (1921)
The Scarab Ring (1921)
The Land of Hope (1921)
The Single Track (1921)
Sinner or Saint (1923)
Two Shall Be Born (1924)
Crime Without Passion (1934)

References

External links

 Fuller Mellish with Mary Pickford in Esmerelda

1865 births
1936 deaths
Male actors from London
English male stage actors
Burials at Kensico Cemetery
English emigrants to the United States